Nuegados is a traditional plate from many different countries in Latin America and many different villages in La Mancha as Valdepeñas, Membrilla y La Solana (Spain). Nuégados are "nothing more than fried dumplings coated with a sweet sugar cane sauce"  or honey in La Mancha. To prepare nuégados, one deep fries a dough made of corn flour, baking powder, butter, salt, and water in oil. A cinnamon sugar syrup is then poured on top of the dumplings. They are often eaten with coffee.

See also
Salvadoran cuisine

References

Salvadoran cuisine
Dumplings
Deep fried foods